Leonard Christophere' Walston III (born October 17, 1981), is an American-born singer-songwriter, composer, musician, producer, and audio engineer.  In 2013, his independent release, "You Should Be Here" spent more than three months on the UK Soul Charts and was named 2013's #1 Song of the Year by the Soul Discovery Radio Show and Podcast on Solar Radio.

Biography
Leonard Walston was born on October 17, 1981 in Anderson, Indiana to Leonard Jr. and Harrita Walston.  His appreciation for music began at an early age; playing the piano at age four and singing in church and school at age five.  In the spring of 2000, Walston left Anderson to attend the Berklee College of Music in Boston, MA, where he majored in Music Business & Administration.  After graduating in the spring of 2003, he moved to Minneapolis, Minnesota to further his education at the Institute of Production and Recording (IPR) and pursue a career as a music producer and audio engineer.

Recordings
The breakthrough for Leonard Walston occurred with his independent recording, "You Should Be Here", which was written, produced, performed, mixed, and mastered by Walston himself.  "You Should Be Here" was released August 13, 2013 on iTunes, CD Baby, Google Play, and Amazon.  Within two days of its release, the single became a top seller on CD Baby's Urban/R&B charts.

‘You Should Be Here' was well received internationally, gaining its first notoriety in the UK. The single gained favorable reviews from online Soul and Jazz music reviewers. Sonic Soul Reviews said that Walston "lets his true destiny run free" and that 'You Should Be Here' is a "great song. . ." with "great production, great voice." During an interview with Walston and Soul Discovery's Mick O'Donnell of Solar Radio, O'Donnell refers to Walston and his song 'You Should Be Here' as "an amazing voice, amazing production and lyric content. You can't beat it." Roger Williams of SoulSorts on the HotFM called it "five and a half minutes of the finest soul music release this year".

Discography

Singles

References

External links
UK Soul Chart
Soul Discovery

Reviews
Soul Discovery's Top 20 of 2013 on Sonic Soul Reviews
SoulSorts' Top 50 Songs of 2013 on Sonic Soul Reviews
Sonic Soul Reviews – Len Walston's "You Should Be Here"

Living people
American contemporary R&B singers
Writers from Anderson, Indiana
1981 births
Musicians from Anderson, Indiana
African-American male singer-songwriters
21st-century African-American male singers
Singer-songwriters from Indiana